Claudio Santini (born 12 February 1992) is an Italian footballer who plays as a forward for  club Rimini.

Club career
He made his Serie C debut for Lucchese on 30 August 2014 in a game against Santarcangelo.

On 5 July 2019, he signed a 2-year contract with Serie C club Padova.

On 19 July 2022, Santini joined Rimini on a two-year contract.

References

External links
 
 

1992 births
Living people
People from Bagno a Ripoli
Sportspeople from the Metropolitan City of Florence
Italian footballers
Association football forwards
Serie B players
Serie C players
Serie D players
Empoli F.C. players
U.S. Gavorrano players
S.S.D. Lucchese 1905 players
A.C. Prato players
U.S. Città di Pontedera players
Ascoli Calcio 1898 F.C. players
A.C.N. Siena 1904 players
U.S. Alessandria Calcio 1912 players
Calcio Padova players
Rimini F.C. 1912 players
Footballers from Tuscany